Casey Frank (born October 23, 1977) is an American-New Zealand former professional basketball player who spent the majority of his 17-year career in the New Zealand NBL and Australian NBL. After playing four years of college basketball for Northern Arizona, Frank arrived in New Zealand in 2002 and remained in the region for the remainder of his career. Frank was named Outstanding Forward and selected to the All-Star Five three times each. He was an import with the New Zealand Breakers in their debut season until he was cut mid-season, and has also played for the Wollongong Hawks and Gold Coast Blaze in Australia. Frank debuted for the Tall Blacks in China in 2005 and gained New Zealand citizenship for inclusion in the 2006 Commonwealth Games silver medal-winning team. He went on to participate in the 2006 and 2010 FIBA World Championships, as well as the 2014 FIBA World Cup.

Since 2015, Casey has been a commentator for ANBL, but on 15 March, 2023, he missed the game in Sydney for the deciding Game 5 of ANBL Finals between New Zealand Breakers and Sydney Kings due to illness.

Professional career
Frank was tested by different teams in Spain, France and Australia between 1999 and 2000.

In January 2001, he signed with the La Crosse Bobcats of the Continental Basketball Association. The next month, he was placed on the injured reserve list. In nine games for the Bobcats, he averaged 4.7 points, 5.3 rebounds 1.8 assists per game.

For the 2001–02 season, Frank played in Sweden for Sallen Basket. In 2002, he joined the Auckland Stars of the New Zealand NBL where he played eight seasons, winning two championships (2004 & 2005) and many individual awards. In 2006, he gained New Zealand citizenship, allowing him to play for the Tall Blacks and as a Kiwi in the NZNBL and the ANBL.

Frank signed with the New Zealand Breakers of the Australian NBL for the club's debut season in 2003–04. However, in November 2003, he was released by the Breakers after appearing in just 12 games.

On September 5, 2005, he signed with the West Sydney Razorbacks of the Australian NBL as an injury-replacement for Nick Horvath. Later that month, he left the Razorbacks after appearing in just three games. In November 2005, he re-joined the New Zealand Breakers as an injury-replacement, but had to be let go after just two games due to the return of Adrian Majstrovich from injury.

In March 2006, he signed a two-year deal with the Wollongong Hawks of the Australian NBL. He finished his first full season in the ANBL, playing 33 games and averaging 11.8 points, 7.2 rebounds and 1.9 assists per game.

In April 2007, he signed with the Gold Coast Blaze. In November 2009, he re-signed with the Blaze as a short-term injury replacement for Greg Vanderjagt. He left the Blaze after three games. Frank later signed with the Wellington Saints for the 2010 New Zealand NBL season. He continued on with the Saints in 2011, 2012, and 2013.

On 8 January 2014, Frank signed with the New Zealand Breakers as an injury replacement for Alex Pledger. Two days later, he played his first game for the Breakers since 2005, recording 9 points, 2 rebounds, 1 assist and 1 block in just under 16 minutes of action in a 93–87 win over the Melbourne Tigers. On 17 January, in his second game for the Breakers, Frank recorded 3 points, 1 rebound and 1 assist in a loss to the Perth Wildcats. In the loss, he lasted just over seven minutes before fouling out in club record time.

On 11 February 2014, Frank signed with the Waikato Pistons for the 2014 New Zealand NBL season, joining his former Saints coach, Pero Cameron, at the Pistons.

On 13 February 2015, Frank signed with the Super City Rangers for the 2015 New Zealand NBL season.

On 27 March 2016, Frank signed with the Wellington Saints, returning to the club for a second stint. He appeared in seven games for the club before departing in late April.

In April 2021, Frank was named as the 22nd ranked player for the New Zealand NBL's list of the top 40 players to celebrate 40 years of being a league.

Personal life
Frank's partner is South African-born actress, Mia Pistorius. The pair have been together since 2002 when Frank first arrived in New Zealand.

In August 2013, Frank graduated with a Master of Business Administration (MBA).

In 2016, Frank played the role of a villain in the Bollywood film Mohenjo Daro starring Hrithik Roshan.

Frank featured in Celebrity Treasure Island 2021.

References

External links
Eurobasket.com profile
ANBL stats

1977 births
Living people
2006 FIBA World Championship players
2010 FIBA World Championship players
2014 FIBA Basketball World Cup players
American expatriate basketball people in Australia
American expatriate basketball people in France
American expatriate basketball people in New Zealand
American expatriate basketball people in Sweden
American men's basketball players
Auckland Stars players
Basketball players at the 2006 Commonwealth Games
Commonwealth Games medallists in basketball
Commonwealth Games silver medallists for New Zealand
Gold Coast Blaze players
La Crosse Bobcats players
New Zealand Breakers players
New Zealand men's basketball players
Northern Arizona Lumberjacks men's basketball players
People from Port Jefferson, New York
Power forwards (basketball)
Sportspeople from Suffolk County, New York
Super City Rangers players
Waikato Pistons players
Wellington Saints players
West Sydney Razorbacks players
Wollongong Hawks players
Medallists at the 2006 Commonwealth Games